Corey James is an English disc jockey, producer and remixer.

Biography
During his career, he has released many electronic dance music records on labels such as Size Records, Protocol Recordings, Big Beat Records, Sosumi Records, Spinnin' Records, Fonk Recordings and Armada Music. His repertoire also includes numerous remixes and bootlegs for artists such as Steve Angello, Galantis, Alesso, Feenixpawl, AN21 and Max Vangeli.  James's passion for house music appeared at a young age through his hometown's cultural love of music. Watching Steve Angello's live performance in Cream Liverpool was the defining moment in his plan to pursue a career in the music industry. He was named one of the Top 100 Producers by 1001Tracklists, a ranking reflecting DJ support. James performed at Creamfields festival on 28 August 2016  and joined Steve Angello on his BBC Radio 1 residency on 17 November 2016.

Discography

Extended plays and singles

Remixes

Compilations
 The Sound Of Sosumi Vol. 1. – Sosumi Records (12 October 2015)

References

External links
Corey James on AllMusic
Interview on Discogs

1992 births
Living people
English DJs
English electronic musicians
English house musicians
Electronic dance music DJs